William Johnston Clymer (December 18, 1873 – December 26, 1936) nicknamed "Derby Day Bill", was an American professional baseball player and manager. After his playing career, Clymer became a successful minor league manager.

Baseball career
At the age of 17, Clymer appeared in three games for the Philadelphia Athletics of the American Association.  In 11 at-bats as a Major League player, he did not collect a hit, but did have one base on balls and one stolen base.

Clymer went on to play 18 seasons in the minor leagues (1891–1906) and was a minor league manager for approximately 29 years (1898–1932). He was the second minor league manager with more than 2,000 wins. Clymer died at the age of 63 in his hometown of Philadelphia, and is interred at North Cedar Hill Cemetery.

References

External links

Major League Baseball shortstops
Philadelphia Athletics (AA 1891) players
Lebanon Cedars players
Portland (minor league baseball) players
Buffalo Bisons (minor league) managers
Rochester Patriots players
Ottawa Wanderers players
Wilkes-Barre Coal Barons players
Kansas City Blues (baseball) players
Toronto Canucks players
Louisville Colonels (minor league) managers
Louisville Colonels (minor league) players
Columbus Senators players
Newark Bears (IL) players
Toronto Maple Leafs (International League) managers
Toledo Mud Hens managers
Baseball players from Philadelphia
19th-century baseball players
1873 births
1936 deaths